A general officer is an officer of high rank in the armies, and in some nations' air forces, space forces, and marines or naval infantry.

In some usages the term "general officer" refers to a rank above colonel.

The term general is used in two ways: as the generic title for all grades of general officer and as a specific rank. 
It originates in the 16th century, as a shortening of captain general, which rank was taken from Middle French capitaine général.
The adjective general had been affixed to officer designations since the late medieval period to indicate relative superiority or an extended jurisdiction.

General officer ranks and history

The various grades of general officer are at the top of the military rank structure. Lower-ranking officers in land-centric military forces are typically known as field officers or field-grade officers, and below them are company-grade officers.

Common systems 
There are two common systems of general ranks used worldwide. In addition, there is a third system, the Arab system of ranks, which is used throughout the Middle East and North Africa but is not used elsewhere in the world.

Variations of one form, the old European system, were once used throughout Europe. It is used in Germany, where it comes from originally, and from where it eventually spread to the United Kingdom and thence subsequently to other Commonwealth countries and the United States. The general officer ranks are named by prefixing "general", as an adjective, with field officer ranks, although in some countries the highest general officers are titled field marshal, marshal, or captain general.

The other is derived from the French Revolution, where generals' ranks are named according to the unit they (theoretically) command.

Old European system

The system used either a brigadier general or a colonel general rank (i.e. exclude one of the italicised ranks).

In the 17th and 18th centuries, it became customary in Prussia and other German states to confer the rank of "full" general with the addition of the branch of service from which the general emerged and which originally also determined the character of the formations which he commanded, e.g. general of the infantry, general of the cavalry and general of the artillery. Such rank designations were also introduced in the Imperial Russian Army, firstly by the emperor Peter I. 

The rank of field marshal was used by some countries as the highest rank, while in other countries it was used as a divisional or brigade rank. Many countries (notably pre-revolutionary France and eventually much of Latin America) actually used two brigade command ranks, which is why some countries now use two stars as their brigade general insignia. Mexico and Argentina still use two brigade command ranks.

In some states (particularly in the Commonwealth since the 1920s), the equivalent to brigadier general is brigadier, which is not always considered by these armies to be a general officer rank, although it is always treated as equivalent to the rank of brigadier general for comparative purposes.

As a lieutenant outranks a sergeant major; confusion often arises because a lieutenant is outranked by a major. Originally the serjeant major was, exclusively, the commander of the infantry, junior only to the captain-general and lieutenant general. The distinction of serjeant major general only applied after serjeant majors were introduced as a rank of field officer. Serjeant was eventually dropped from both rank titles, creating the modern rank titles. Serjeant Major (later spelled sergeant major) as a senior rank of non-commissioned officer was a later creation.

The equivalent of the rank of general in the navy was admiral.

French (Revolutionary) system

Arab system 
The armies of Arab countries use traditional Arabic titles. These were formalized in their current system to replace the Turkish system that was formerly in use in the Arab world and the Turco-Egyptian ranks in Egypt.

Other variations
Other nomenclatures for general officers include the titles and ranks:
 Adjutant general
 Commandant-general
 Inspector general
 General-in-chief
 General of the Army (which is distinct from the title army general)
 General of the Air Force (USAF only)
 General of the Armies of the United States (of America), a title created for General John J. Pershing, and subsequently granted posthumously to George Washington
  ("general admiral") (German Navy)
 Air general and aviation general
 Wing general and group general
  (a Serb/Slovenian/Macedonian rank immediately inferior to colonel general, and roughly equivalent to Commonwealth/US major general)
 Director general (a common administrative term sometimes used as an appointment in military services)
 Director general of national defence (most senior rank in the Mexican Armed Forces)
 Controller general (general officer rank in the French National Police)
 Prefect general (the most senior rank of the Argentine Naval Prefecture)
 Master-General of the Ordnance (very senior British military position)
 Police General (most senior rank of the Philippine National Police)
 Commissioner (highest rank of the Bureau of Immigration)
  (Police General), the highest rank in the Indonesian National Police

In addition to militarily educated generals, there are also generals in medicine and engineering. The rank of the most senior chaplain, (chaplain general), is also usually considered to be a general officer rank.

Specific rank of general
In the old European system, a general, without prefix or suffix (and sometimes referred to informally as a "full general"), is usually the most senior type of general, above lieutenant general and directly below field marshal as a four-star rank (NATO OF-9).

Usually it is the most senior peacetime rank, with more senior ranks (for example, field marshal, marshal of the air force, fleet admiral) being used only in wartime or as honorary titles.

In some armies, however, the rank of captain general, general of the army, army general or colonel general occupied or occupies this position.  Depending on circumstances and the army in question, these ranks may be considered to be equivalent to a "full" general or to a field marshal five-star rank (NATO OF-10).

The rank of general came about as a "captain-general", the captain of an army in general (i.e., the whole army). The rank of captain-general began appearing around the time of the organisation of professional armies in the 17th century. In most countries "captain-general" contracted to just "general".

General ranks by country

The following articles deal with the rank of general, or its equivalent, as it is or was employed in the militaries of those countries:
 General (Australia)
 General (Bangladesh)
 General (Canada)
  (China) – People's Republic of China (PRC) and Republic of China (ROC/Taiwan)
 General (Denmark), 
 General (Estonia), 
 General (Finland), 
 General (Germany), 
  (Greece)
 General (India)
  (North and South Korea)
 
 General (Nigeria)
 General (Pakistan)
 General (Poland), 
 General (Sri Lanka)
 General (Sweden), 
 General (Switzerland)
 General (United Kingdom)
 General (United States)
 General (Yugoslav People's Army)

Army generals’ insignia

Air force generals' insignia

Naval infantry generals' insignia

Air force and naval equivalents
Some countries (such as the United States) use the general officer ranks for both the army and the air force, as well as their marine corps; other states only use the general officer ranks for the army, while in the air force they use air officers as the equivalent of general officers.  They use the air force rank of air chief marshal as the equivalent of the specific army rank of general.  This latter group includes the British Royal Air Force and many current and former Commonwealth air forces—e.g. Royal Australian Air Force, Indian Air Force, Royal New Zealand Air Force, Nigerian Air Force, Pakistan Air Force, etc.

In most navies, flag officers are the equivalent of general officers, and the naval rank of admiral is equivalent to the specific army rank of general.  A noteworthy historical exception was the Cromwellian naval rank "general at sea".  In recent years in the American service there is a tendency to use flag officer and flag rank to refer to generals and admirals of the services collectively.

See also
General officers in the United States
List of comparative military ranks
List of Roman generals
General officer commanding
Général
Generalissimo
Shōgun

Notes

References

External links 

 Generals of World War II
 Schema-root.org: US Generals News feeds for US Generals in the news
Marines.mil: General Officer Biographies  Biographies of US Marine Corps General Officers
 Bios & Information on Generals of Western History Information on 10 Generals who influenced Western History

 
Military ranks